Church Farm Marshes is a 56 hectare nature reserve in Thorington in Suffolk. It is managed by the Suffolk Wildlife Trust.

This site has areas of marshland, wet and dry woodland, and grassland. The flower-rich marshes have southern marsh orchid, marsh marigold and ragged robin. Grazing maintains diversity of flora in the meadows and marshes, ensuring a good population of insects which provide food for birds.

There is access to the reserve from Thorington Road near the church.

References

Suffolk Wildlife Trust